Botucatu is a city in the southeastern region of Brazil and is located  from São Paulo, the capital of the state of São Paulo. It lies on the top of a plateau ( high). Botucatu became a village in 1855, and a city in 1876.

The region has humid-subtropical weather, with dry, cold winters and hot, wet summers. During winter the temperature rarely falls below .

Botucatu's biggest employer is UNESP, one of the three São Paulo state universities, one of the top universities in all of Latin America and part of several World Top Universities list, making the city an important center for medical research and education. In particular, the city has two campuses, one centered on biomedical sciences, including a school of medicine, an Institute of Biosciences and school of veterinarian sciences, and the other centered on agricultural sciences. The leading industrial company is Embraer through a subsidiary, Neiva, that has a multipurpose plant there but primarily manufacture the EMB 202 "Ipanemão" crop spraying aircraft. Along with Rondonópolis and Ribeirão Preto, it is one of the centers of the large Brazilian airborne spraying industry. The city has also two bus bodyworks builders, the Brazilian  and the Basque Irizar. Besides UNESP, there are other private colleges.

The city boasts a higher than usual elementary and mid-level educational network, including public and private institutions. It is also an important center for "organic" agriculture being the site of a recognized certification body.

History 

The city of Botucatu, herein referred as such for being the seat of an archdiocese, has experienced many changes during a century and a half of existence, the most substantial being the arrival of the state university in 1960.

The modern name Botucatu derives from the old Tupi name "ybytukatu" meaning "good wind", and was applied in 1720 when the land here was parceled up and granted to settlers.   Local legends survive that predate the period of structured settlement, however, relating to the time when Botucatu was the focus of a transit crossing along the route connecting the Atlantic coast with the Peruvian lands.

In the nineteenth century Old Botucatu was a place full of romantic characters such as coffee barons, musicians and poets and hinterland explorers. One of these is Conde (count) de Serra Negra, who is locally considered the father of Lawrence of Arabia and Rhett Butler, who is said to be buried there. Of note, Botucatu's municipal council has declared war on Great-Britain on two distinct occasions, with no actual consequences.

In April 2014 opened the first mall in the city.

References 

 
Populated places established in 1876
1876 establishments in Brazil